Kamianka-Buzka Raion was a raion in Lviv Oblast in western Ukraine. Its administrative center was Kamianka-Buzka. The raion was abolished on 18 July 2020 as part of the administrative reform of Ukraine, which reduced the number of raions of Lviv Oblast to seven. The area of Kamianka-Buzka Raion was split between Chervonohrad and Lviv Raions.

It was established in 1940.

At the time of disestablishment, the raion consisted of four hromadas:
 Dobrotvir settlement hromada with the administration in the urban-type settlement of Dobrotvir, transferred to Chervonohrad Raion;
 Kamianka-Buzka urban hromada with the administration in Kamianka-Buzka, transferred to Lviv Raion;
 Novyi Yarychiv settlement hromada with the administration in the urban-type settlement of Novyi Yarychiv, transferred to Lviv Raion;
 Zhovtantsi rural hromada with the administration in the selo of Zhovtantsi, transferred to Lviv Raion.

See also
 Administrative divisions of Lviv Oblast

References

Former raions of Lviv Oblast
1940 establishments in Ukraine
Ukrainian raions abolished during the 2020 administrative reform